Jeanne Galice, known professionally as Jain, is a French singer-songwriter.

During her career, Jain has won several awards, including two Victoire awards, European Border Breakers Award and was nominated for a Grammy.

European Border Breakers Awards
The European Border Breakers Award is an annual prize awarded to ten emerging artists or groups who reached audiences outside their own countries with their first internationally released album in the past year.

Grammy Awards
A Grammy Award is an award presented by The Recording Academy to recognize achievement in the music industry.

MTV Europe Music Awards
An MTV Europe Music Award is an award presented by Viacom International Media Networks to honour artists and music in pop culture.

NRJ Music Awards
NRJ Music Awards is an annual French award ceremony presented by the French radio station NRJ to honor the best in the French and worldwide music industry.

Prix Talents W9
The Prix Talents W9 is annual French music awards, organized by the W9 television channel.

Victoires de la Musique
Victoires de la Musique is an annual French award ceremony where the Victoire accolade is delivered by the French Ministry of Culture to recognize outstanding achievement in the music industry that recognizes the best musical artists of the year.

References

Jain